James Blake was the defending champion but lost in the quarterfinals to Andre Agassi.

Tim Henman won in the final 6–3, 6–4 against Fernando González.

Seeds
All sixteen seeds received a bye to the second round.

  Andre Agassi (semifinals)
  Andy Roddick (semifinals)
  Paradorn Srichaphan (quarterfinals)
  Fernando González (final)
  Yevgeny Kafelnikov (third round)
  James Blake (quarterfinals)
  Max Mirnyi (quarterfinals)
  Nikolay Davydenko (third round)
  Arnaud Clément (second round)
  Tim Henman (champion)
  Mardy Fish (quarterfinals)
  Nicolás Massú (withdrew)
  Sargis Sargsian (third round)
  Greg Rusedski (third round)
  Mario Ančić (third round)
  Brian Vahaly (third round)

Draw

Finals

Top half

Section 1

Section 2

Bottom half

Section 3

Section 4

External links
 2003 Legg Mason Tennis Classic draw

2003 ATP Tour